KURL (93.3 FM) is a Christian radio station licensed to Billings, Montana, United States. The station is currently owned by Elenbaas Media, Inc. On May 24, 2010 it was announced that the station, then known as KYYA FM 93.3 was to be sold to Elenbaas Media, Inc after FCC approval.

History
The station first signed on the air on April 5, 1969. Throughout most of the station's life, it was known as Y-93 FM and is the dominant Top 40/CHR station for the Billings metro area for more than 3 decades.

Ownership
In June 2006, KYYA-FM was acquired by Cherry Creek Radio from Fisher Radio Regional Group as part of a 24 station deal with a total reported sale price of $33.3 million.  Recently local Cherry Creek radio stations (KBLG-AM, KRZN-FM, KRKX-FM) were purchased by Connoissuer Media LLC. KWMY-FM MY-92-5 was moved to the 105.9 frequency replacing 105.9 The Bar and the longtime former Top-40 station KYYA-FM Y-93.3 (or Y93) went silent for a short period of time.

References

External links

URL
URL
Radio stations established in 1969
1969 establishments in Montana